Dominique Alexandre Godron (25 March 1807 - 16 August 1880) was a French physician, botanist, geologist and speleologist born in the town of Hayange, in the département Moselle.

Godron studied medicine at the University of Strasbourg, and during his career distinguished himself in natural sciences as well as in the field of medicine. In 1854 he became dean and professor of natural history to the Faculty of Sciences at Nancy. Here he established a natural history museum and reorganized its botanical garden (now the Jardin Dominique Alexandre Godron, renamed in his honor).

Among his numerous writings were a publication on the flora of the Lorraine region of France called "Flore de Lorraine" (1843), and the three-volume "Flore de France", a work on flora native to France and Corsica that was co-written with botanist Jean Charles Marie Grenier (1808-1875). In addition to his botanical works, he published a number of studies in the field of ethnology.

Before Mendel, he discovered the main features of hybridation. In "de l'Espece et des races dans les êtres organises" he also demonstrated that hybridization in the vegetal world was, against the dominant thinking at the time, similar to hybridization in the animal world. He finally demonstrated the unity of mankind in his book dedicated to our species.

In 1846, he was honoured by botanists Jean Baptiste Mougeot and Joseph Henri Léveillé who named Godronia, which is a genus of fungi in the family Helotiaceae. Then in 1927, William Webster Diehl and Edith Katherine Cash published Godroniopsis, which is also a genus of fungi in the family Helotiaceae.

References 

 Biography of Dominique Alexandre Godron (translated from French).

French naturalists
1807 births
1880 deaths
Members of the French Academy of Sciences
People from Hayange
19th-century French botanists
19th-century French physicians